Pavel Aleksandrovich Belov  (born 18 December 1977 in Ust-Ilimsk), is a Russian physicist, head of The International Research Centre for Nanophotonics and Metamaterials (St. Petersburg, Russia).

Education
After finishing Saint Petersburg Lyceum 30, Pavel Belov graduated with honors from the ITMO University in 2000. He defended his PhD thesis twice: from ITMO University in Russia in 2003 with the thesis "Analytical modeling of electromagnetic crystals", and then in Finland in 2006 at the Helsinki University of Technology with the thesis "Analytical modeling of metamaterials and new principle of sub-wavelength imaging". In November 2010 he received doctor of science degree for his thesis "Analytical modeling of electromagnetic crystals and left-handed materials".

The main Dr. Belov's achievement is the development of metamaterials which can transfer superresolution images (i.e., much smaller than the wavelength of the radiation used), which is much better than the resolution of conventional optical systems for image transmission and processing. Findings of Pavel Belov have both fundamental and practical importance, because they can radically change the concept of designing optical and microwave components of various devices and thus lead to a revolution in information and telecommunication technologies.

In 2010 Pavel Belov invited professor Yuri Kivshar as a leading researcher in terms of government Megagrant program. Together they established International Research Centre for Nanophotonics and Metamaterials. This laboratory performs broad research in the fields of metamaterials, plasmonics, non-linear optics.

Career
Dr. Belov has extensive experience of working abroad (Finland, South Korea, United Kingdom) with such industrial giants as Nokia, Samsung Electronics and Bosch.
He is a member of the Council of young scientists and specialists of the ITMO University.
He is also a member of IEEE, AP-S, ED-S, MTT-S, LEO-S (Laser and Electro-Optics Society, www.i-leos.org); URSI, SPIE scientific societies. Since October 2015, Dr Belov has been on the Board of Scientific Advisors at Metamaterial Technologies Inc., an international optical nano-composites company (www.metamaterial.com)

Awards
Dr. Pavel Belov is a laureate of the Russian Federation President's Prize in Science and Innovation for Young Scientists in 2009 (Presidential Decree No.139 of 4.02.2010). The prize is awarded for outstanding contributions to the physics of metamaterials and the development of devices for transmission and processing of superresolution images.
He is the winner of grants for State Support of Young Russian Ph.D. Scientists in 2005 and 2009. His other prizes include:
IET Achievement Medal (IET, UK, 2006)
International Dennis Gabor Award (NOVOFER Foundation, Hungary, 2003)
URSI Young Scientist Award (Belgium, 2002)

Publications
Pavel Belov is the author of more than 200 scientific articles in refereed journals, 90 conference proceedings and 13 book chapters.
His h-index is 34. His work has generated over 4,300 citations.

See also
Metamaterials
Photonic crystal

References

External links

1977 births
Living people
Metamaterials scientists
Academic staff of ITMO University
People from Ust-Ilimsk
21st-century Russian physicists